Petra Zindler (born 11 February 1966, in Köln) is a German former swimmer who competed in the 1984 Summer Olympics.

References

1966 births
Living people
German female swimmers
German female medley swimmers
German female butterfly swimmers
Olympic swimmers of West Germany
Swimmers at the 1984 Summer Olympics
Olympic bronze medalists for West Germany
Olympic bronze medalists in swimming
Sportspeople from Cologne
European Aquatics Championships medalists in swimming
Medalists at the 1984 Summer Olympics